The women's 4 × 400 metres relay event at the 2005 Summer Universiade was held on 19–20 August in Izmir, Turkey.

Medalists

* Athletes who appeared in heats only.

Results

Heats

Final

References

Finals results
Full results

Athletics at the 2005 Summer Universiade
2005